Adams City is an unincorporated community located in Adams County, Colorado, United States.  Much of it was incorporated into Commerce City in 1952.

History
Adams City was laid out in 1903, with developers hoping the county seat would be established there; however, Brighton was elected county seat in 1904, and Adams City was vacated in 1922. In 1946 and 1947, Adams County School District 14 was formed from surrounding schools, and Adams City was redeveloped about that time. On 1952-07-08, area residents voted 251 to 24 to incorporate Commerce Town (later renamed Commerce City), which includes southern Adams City.

Geography
Adams City is located at  (39.8266528,-104.9288672).

Education
Adams County School District 14 serves the community today.

Notable person
 Lucille Colacito, catcher for the All-American Girls Professional Baseball League.

References

Unincorporated communities in Adams County, Colorado
Unincorporated communities in Colorado
Commerce City, Colorado